Nong Sida is a tambon (subdistrict) of Nong Saeng District, in Saraburi Province, Thailand. In 2019 it had a total population of 963 people.

Administration

Central administration
The tambon is subdivided into 6 administrative villages (muban).

Local administration
The whole area of the subdistrict is covered by the subdistrict administrative organization (SAO) Nong Hua Pho (องค์การบริหารส่วนตำบลหนองหัวโพ).

References

External links
Thaitambon.com on Nong Sida

Tambon of Saraburi Province
Populated places in Saraburi province